Johnny Eng (born ca. 1958), also known as Onionhead or Machinegun Johnny, is a Hong Kong-born American criminal. He is a former Manhattan triad leader and drug dealer.

Criminal history
Eng was arrested at least five times in the 1970s.  In 1983, Eng became the leader of the Flying Dragons.  By 1988 he had moved into the heroin trade in Manhattan's Chinatown.   A confidential report issued by the Justice Department called Eng "one of the five major heroin dealers in New York City." A native of Hong Kong, Eng was 31 years old in 1989, when he fled to that city to avoid arrest and prosecution.  He was arrested there in 1989.  Eng fought extradition for nearly three years, but was brought to the United States in 1991.  In December 1992, Eng was convicted of 14 counts of heroin smuggling and conspiracy.

In March 1993, Eng was sentenced to 24 years in prison and fined $3,500,000 by Federal District Court judge Reena Raggi.  The government also confiscated Eng's 200-acre estate in Newfoundland, Pennsylvania, which was reported to have been used for machine gun practice by members of the Flying Dragons. He was released several years early on 8 November 2010.

Murder of wife
On July 13, 2011, Eng's wife Lori Eng was fatally shot by another Flying Dragons member, David Chea, at her apartment in Flushing, Queens, New York. Chea then committed suicide.

References 

American drug traffickers
American crime bosses
People from Chinatown, Manhattan
Hong Kong emigrants to the United States
Gang members
Triad members
American gangsters of Chinese descent
Hong Kong gangsters
Criminals from Manhattan
Gangsters from New York City